Tomás Caleb Laibe Sáez (born 28 September 1990) is a Chilean political scientist who is member of the Chilean Constitutional Convention.

In October 2021, he had Covid.

See also
 List of members of the Chilean Constitutional Convention

References

External links
 

1990 births
Living people
21st-century Chilean politicians
Socialist Party of Chile politicians
Members of the Chilean Constitutional Convention
Diego Portales University alumni
People from Aysén Region